Class Act is a 1992 comedy film.

Class Act or Class act may also refer to:

 Community Living Assistance Services and Supports Act AKA CLASS Act, an American federal law
 Class act (performance), a noun phrase that lauds an admirable person, team, or organization
 P5 (comics) AKA Class Act, a comic strip in The Dandy
 Asterix and the Class Act, the thirty-second album of the French-language Asterix comic book series
 A Class Act, a musical by Edward Kleban that debuted in 2000
 Class Act (British TV series), a 1994–1995 British comedy drama
 Class Act (Irish TV series), a 2007–2008 Irish talent show
 Tracey Ullman: A Class Act, a TV special that debuted in 1993, starring actress-comedian Tracey Ullman
 Class Act, a graphic novel by Jerry Craft